Paulina Oduro is a Ghanaian highlife musician, actress, talent show judge and stage performer.
She is 7ft 8 in height the tallest woman in Ghana.

Early life

Paulina Oduro was born in Sekondi-Takoradi in the Western Region of Ghana. When she was seven years old she moved to Japan for two years with her father, a diplomat, and mother, and took lessons in playing classical piano until the age of nine. She travelled to London with her parents when she was 10, and took part in many school plays, acting and dancing. She became a qualified nurse a decade later, but at 21 years old left this profession to pursue the performing arts and started singing professionally.

Musical career
Oduro's singing career became commercial in the 1980s when she was introduced to soca music and reggae by musicians and bands she played with, including David Rudder and Arrow. She was part of the Casanova reggae band in 1982 which released the single "Loving You This Way" within a period of six months. Oduro went solo in 1999, launching her album Woman Power.

Personal life
Oduro reportedly moved to settle in Ghana in 2009 due to her son Raymond Charles's Jnr embarrassing the family stealing her beads.
Her grandson Carter is a famous footballer in Wales, United Kingdom.
She claims to be the mother Teresa of Ghana. This is of course alleged.

Performances for charity

Oduro has supported several fundraising and charity events with her performances. These events include Love Your World 5000 for Autism awareness, Dream Child African Renaissance Project and Grand Ball by MUSIGA.

Natural Skin Tone campaign
Oduro has served as an ambassador for a campaign launched in July 2014 by Ama K. Abebrese promoting natural skin tones. She joins other famous women in Ghana, including Hamamat Montia and Nana Ama McBrown, as forerunners in fighting skin bleaching in the  "I love My Natural Skin Tone" campaign.

Filmography
Coming to Africa
Love Regardless
The Hero: Service to Humanity
Chronicles of Odumkrom: The Headmaster

References

Living people
Ghanaian women musicians
Ghanaian actresses
Year of birth missing (living people)
Ghanaian highlife musicians